George Loyd (1843 – December 17, 1892), whose last name was occasionally spelled "Lloyd," was a United States Army soldier. He fought in the Battle of the Little Big Horn and in the Battle of Wounded Knee, now called the Wounded Knee Massacre, receiving the Medal of Honor for his actions in the latter.

Biography
George Loyd was born in County Tyrone, Ireland in 1843. He immigrated to the U.S.

Loyd first enlisted in the U.S. Army (7th Cavalry Regiment) on March 17, 1866, in Philadelphia. He was discharged as a corporal in Canton, Texas, when his term of service expired on March 20, 1869. He re-enlisted on March 21, 1869, at Canton in the 6th Cavalry Regiment; he was discharged as a private on March 21, 1874, at Camp Supply, Indian Territory upon the expiration of his term of service.

Loyd's third enlistment was into Company G, 7th Cavalry on April 13, 1874, at St. Louis, Missouri. Loyd was a survivor of the Battle of the Little Big Horn on June 25–26, 1876; he was promoted to corporal on June 25, 1876. He was discharged as a sergeant on April 12, 1879, at Fort Abraham Lincoln, Dakota Territory when his term of service was completed.

Loyd immediately re-enlisted at Fort Abraham Lincoln and served until his five-year enlistment expired on April 12, 1884, at Fort Totten, Dakota Territory. He re-enlisted on April 15, 1884, at Fort Totten and served until discharged as a sergeant on April 14, 1889 Fort Riley, Kansas.

"Geo" Loyd re-enlisted on April 15, 1889, at Fort Riley. He was among the cavalrymen ordered to capture Chief Big Foot. On December 29, 1890, troopers surrounded the Sioux camp on Wounded Knee Creek with the intention of arresting the Sioux chieftain and disarming his followers. Loyd, a sergeant on the day of the battle, was commended for bravery, especially after suffering a wound to his lung; On April 16, 1891, Loyd was awarded the Medal of Honor. On December 17, 1892, slightly less than two years after the battle, First Sergeant Loyd, then one of the oldest soldiers at Fort Riley, Kansas, died by suicide and was buried at the Fort Riley post cemetery.

Medal of Honor Citation

The President of the United States of America, in the name of Congress, takes pleasure in presenting the Medal of Honor to Sergeant George Lloyd, United States Army, for bravery, especially after having been severely wounded through the lung on 29 December 1890, while serving with Company I, 7th U.S. Cavalry, in action at Wounded Knee Creek, South Dakota.

See also

 List of Medal of Honor recipients for the Indian Wars
 American Indian Wars

References

1843 births
1892 deaths
People from County Tyrone
Irish emigrants to the United States (before 1923)
United States Army Medal of Honor recipients
United States Army soldiers
Battle of the Little Bighorn
American Indian Wars recipients of the Medal of Honor
Pine Ridge Campaign
Suicides by firearm in Kansas